Jumper Cable is a fantasy novel by British-American writer Piers Anthony,  the 33rd book of the Xanth series.

Plot introduction

Jumper Spider, the descendant of the spider who accompanied Magician Dor on his adventure to the past, has been caught by a narrative hook and dropped into the human realm of Xanth. Wishing to return home, he teams up with seven lovely maidens to help restore the link between Xanth and Mundania which had been damaged by the Demon Pluto, who is angry for being demoted to a Dwarf Demon and does all he can to stop the group of adventurers from succeeding.

 33
2009 American novels
Tor Books books